The Paxtang Parkway was once part of the Harrisburg, Pennsylvania's Cameron Parkway, a series of scenic routes following Spring Creek, connecting Cameron Street to Walnut Street. Cameron Parkway served as a straight shot between Cameron St. and Derry St. and then Derry St. to Market St. The Parkway then led through Reservoir Park and eventually up to Herr St. and then Elmerton Avenue, completing a beltway through Harrisburg.

References

External links
 http://www.legacy.usatf.org/routes/view.asp?rID=380424 Paxtang Parkway Plus

Harrisburg, Pennsylvania